Colca District may refer to:
Colca District, Huancayo
Colca District, Victor Fajardo

District name disambiguation pages